Drake County is one of the 141 Cadastral divisions of New South Wales.

Drake County was named in honour of Sir Francis Drake (1540–1596). It is located to the north of parts of the Clarence River, Nymboida River and Mann River. It includes the Washpool National Park.

Parishes within this county
A full list of parishes found within this county; their current LGA and mapping coordinates to the approximate centre of each location is as follows:

References

Counties of New South Wales